Ostaszewo  is a village in the administrative district of Gmina Sońsk, within Ciechanów County, Masovian Voivodeship, in east-central Poland, about  north of Warsaw.

The village is composed of five parts: Ostaszewo Wielkie, Ostaszewo-Pańki, Ostaszewo-Włuski, Ostaszewo-Wola Rańcza and Ostaszewo-Czernie.

References

Ostaszewo